Etzalcualiztli  is the name of the sixth month of the Aztec calendar. It is also a festival  in the Aztec religion dedicated to Tlaloc and Chalchihuitlicue.

References

Aztec calendars
Aztec mythology and religion